The Brighton Beach station is an elevated express and terminal station on the BMT Brighton Line of the New York City Subway. It is located over Brighton Beach Avenue between Brighton 5th Street and Brighton 7th Street in Brighton Beach, Brooklyn. The station is served by the Q train at all times and is the southern terminal for the B train on weekdays only.

History 
This station opened on July 2, 1878, as part of an excursion railroad—the Brooklyn, Flatbush and Coney Island Railway—to bring beachgoers from downtown Brooklyn (via a connection with the Long Island Rail Road) to the seashore at Coney Island on the Atlantic Ocean, at a location named Brighton Beach at the same time the railroad arrived.

The station was renovated in the mid to late 1990s.

From September 8, 2002, to May 23, 2004, service was suspended west of Brighton Beach to allow rebuilding of the Coney Island–Stillwell Avenue terminal station, which had deteriorated due to the effects of salt water corrosion and deferred maintenance.

Station layout

Brighton Beach has two island platforms and four tracks. The weekday-only B train (Brighton Express/Sixth Avenue Express) terminates here on the inner express tracks while the full-time Q train (Brighton Local/Broadway Express) stops here on the outer local tracks and continues to Coney Island–Stillwell Avenue. The platforms are canopied for their entire length except for small portions at either ends. There are two elevated structures above the express tracks used for office and maintenance space.

This station has two entrances/exits, both of which are elevated station houses beneath the tracks. The full-time side is at the north end and has two staircases from each platform, a large waiting area inside fare control, regular turnstile bank, and token booth. Outside of fare control, there are three street stairs, two that join at the station house balcony and go down to either southern corners of Brighton 7th Street and Brighton Beach Avenue and one to the northwest corner. Instead of a staircase, the northeast corner has a narrow, enclosed escalator that always goes up and thus can only be used to enter the station.

The second station house has a single staircase from each platform and a pair of twin staircases going down to either side of Brighton Beach Avenue between Brighton Fifth and Brighton Sixth Streets. The token booth and regular turnstile bank here is only open weekdays from 6:00 a.m. to 9:00 p.m. Two HEET turnstiles provide access to/from this entrance at other times.

Between this station and Ocean Parkway, the line becomes six tracks. The local and express tracks split into an extra storage track in-between them in both directions. These tracks are commonly used for storing B trains during midday hours or at the start or end of service, and they end at bumper blocks next to the platforms at Ocean Parkway.

East of this station, there are crossovers and switches used by terminating B trains. The Brighton Line curves north and becomes an embankment after crossing Neptune Avenue on the approach to Sheepshead Bay.

This station was renovated in the mid to late 1990s and included installation of decorative awnings on all street stairs. The 1999 artwork here is called Mermaid/Dionysus and the Pirates by Dan George and features aluminum sculptures on both platforms.

Exits
The station has two mezzanines under the platforms and tracks, each of which has four sets of stairs to the street and one to each platform. The eastern, and staffed entrances are located between Brighton 7th Street and Coney Island Avenue. There is an up-only escalator in place of one of the stairs on the northern side of Brighton Beach Avenue at Coney Island Avenue. The western exit, which is unstaffed, is located between Brighton 5th and 6th Streets.

Gallery

References

External links 

 
 Station Reporter — B Train
 Station Reporter — Q Train
 MTA's Arts For Transit — Brighton Beach (BMT Brighton Line)
 The Subway Nut — Brighton Beach Pictures 
 Brighton Seventh Street — Coney Island Avenue entrance from Google Maps Street View
 Brighton Fifth Street — Brighton Sixth Street entrance from Google Maps Street View
 Platforms from Google Maps Street View

BMT Brighton Line stations
New York City Subway stations in Brooklyn
New York City Subway terminals
Railway stations in the United States opened in 1878
Railway stations in the United States opened in 1907
Brighton Beach
1878 establishments in New York (state)
1907 establishments in New York City